is a Japanese voice actress from Kanagawa, Japan.

Filmography

Anime

1995 

 Ping Pong Club (Yuki Tanabe)
 Saint Tail (Imamura)

1996
Detective Conan (Clerk, Masayo Tokudaiji, Midori Kuriyama, Receptionist, Yuko Ikezawa)
B'tX (B'T Jutaime)
You're Under Arrest (Judy)

1997 

 Cutey Honey Flash (SCUD Panther)
 Kindaichi Shounen no Jikenbo (Shinshi Kaitou)
 Manmaru the Ninja Penguin (Escaping girl, Kado)
 Flame of Recca (Reina)
 Yume no Crayon Oukoku (???)

1998 

 St. Luminous Mission High School (Elizabeth Ryouko Bryan)

1999 

 Kamikaze Kaitou Jeanne (Tsubasa Nagatanigawa)
 GTO: Great Teacher Onizuka (???)
 Ojamajo Doremi (Fafa)

2000 

 Mon Colle Knights (???)
 Digimon Adventure 02 (Ken's Mother)
 Saiyuki (Sanbutsushin 2)
 Hand Maid May (Aoi Saotome)
 Inuyasha (Geisha, Kagome's mother/Mrs. Higurashi)

2001 

 Comic Party (Yuka Tsukishiro)
 Najica Blitz Tactics (Shinobu Misato)
 Vandread: The Second Stage (Onna)

2002 

 Tokyo Underground (Leader)
 G-On Riders (Commanding officer)
 Getbackers (Bather)

2003 

 Lime-iro Senkitan (Sumi Ichijouji)
 Mouse (Mei's Grandfather)
 Zatch Bell (Toy Store Salesgirl)
 Happy Lesson Advanced (Beauty Honey)
 Rumiko Takahashi Anthology (Kobato's son, Ryuuichi)
 Planetes (Announcer, Girl, Girlfriend, Housewife)
 Mermaid Forest (Sayori)

2004 

 Mezzo (Announcer)
 Ragnarok The Animation (Sohi)
 Monster (Receptionist)
 School Rumble (Doctor Michiko)
 Black Jack (Young Black Jack)

2005 

 Lime-iro Ryūkitan X (Sumi Ichijoji)
 Comic Party: Revolution (Yuka Tsukishiro)
 Speed Grapher (Congresswoman)
 GUNxSWORD (Head nurse, Staff woman, Waitress, Woman)
 Lamune (Hiromi's mother)

2006 

 Black Jack 21 (Young Black Jack)
 Nighthead Genesis (Sachie Haga)
 Kemonozume (Amakami, Exam student's mother)
 Gift - eternal rainbow (Sensha's Mother)
 Kekkaishi (Female headquarter member, Kagami-kun, Shizue Yukimura, Tatsuki, Teacher)

2007 

 GR -GIANT ROBO- (Celestine Buñuel)
 Magical Girl Lyrical Nanoha StrikerS (Quint Nakajima)
 Shigurui: Death Frenzy (House Keeper)
 Neuro - Supernatural Detective (Announcer)

2008 

 RIN - Daughters of Mnemosyne (Rona Kurōderu)
 Nabari no Ou (Juuji's mother)
 Code Geass: Lelouch of the Rebellion R2 (Marianne vi Britannia, Sister)
 Uchi no 3 Shimai (???)
 Live On Cardliver Kakeru (Tenkū Musutangu)
 Chaos;HEAd (Senna's Mother)

2009 

 Rideback (Woman Newscaster)
 Sōten Kōro (Bai Lian)
 Princess Lover! (Teppei's Mother)
 InuYasha: The Final Act (Kagome's Mother)
 Kobato. (Homeroom teacher)

2010 

 Togainu no Chi - Bloody Curs (Emma)

2022 

 Detective Conan: Zero's Tea Time (Midori Kuriyama)

Movies

1999 

 Kindaichi Shounen no Jikenbo 2 - Satsuriku no Deep Blue (Voice of Aurora Vision)

2000 

 Case Closed: Captured in Her Eyes (Midori Kuriyama)

2001 

 Case Closed: Countdown to Heaven (Motherhood)
 Inuyasha the Movie: Affections Touching Across Time (Kagome's Mother)

2002 

 Case Closed: The Phantom of Baker Street (Japanese woman announcer)

2004 

 Detective Conan: Magician of the Silver Sky (Yuki)

2006 

 Detective Conan: The Private Eyes' Requiem (Midori Kuriyama)

2008 

 Detective Conan: Full Score of Fear (???)

Video Games

2000 

 Flamberge no Seirei (Shifōne)

2001 

 Comic Party (Yuka Tsukishiro, Makiko Sawada)

2004 

 Castle Shikigami 2 (Fumiko Ozetto van Stein)
 Limeiro Senkitan * Jun (Sumi Ichijouji)

2005 

 Comic Party Portable (Yuka Tsukishiro)

2006 

 Gift -prism- (???)
 Mizu no Senritsu 2 ~Hi no Kioku~ (Ya Shitara)

2009 

 Touka Gettan ~Koufuu no Ryouou~ (Kasuga, Sachiko Gotanda)

2010 

 Blaze Union: Story to Reach the Future (Baretreenu)

Dubbing
Charmed, Kyra (Charisma Carpenter)
Close Encounters of the Third Kind: The Final Cut, Ronnie Neary (Teri Garr)
In Bruges, Jimmy (Jordan Prentice)
Jason Bourne (2022 BS Tokyo edition), Nicolette Parsons (Julia Stiles)

References

External links 
 

1967 births
Living people
Japanese video game actresses
Japanese voice actresses
Voice actresses from Kanagawa Prefecture
20th-century Japanese actresses
21st-century Japanese actresses
Ken Production voice actors